Frisco Pigeon Mambo is a 2000 absurdist fiction novel by author C.D. Payne. The plot revolves around a group of pigeons who were raised in a scientific lab and forced to smoke cigarettes and drink sherry. Because they have only interacted with humans, and because one scientist in particular greets them in the morning with "Hello, men," they assume they are human. They are extremely happy living in captivity, and their lives are upturned when a clueless animal rights group frees them from the lab. In revenge, the birds wreak havoc on San Francisco in order to maintain their smoking and drinking habits. 

The book was at one time in pre-production to be made into an animated film called Party Animals by the Farrelly Brothers for 20th Century Fox Animation.

Absurdist fiction
2000 American novels